Daniel Orlando Smith, OBE (born 28 August 1944) is a British Virgin Islands politician and the former Premier of the British Virgin Islands from 2011 to 2019 and from 2003 to 2007.  He also formerly served as Chief Minister of the British Virgin Islands (as the role was formerly known before the 2007 constitution was adopted) from 2003 to 2007.  He first won the office when his National Democratic Party won the 2003 general election, being the party's first victory at a general election in its history.

Orlando Smith originally qualified as a physician, specialising in obstetrics, and was the territory's chief medical officer for many years both before and after entering politics.  He entered politics at a relatively late stage of his career, being first elected to the Legislative Council of the British Virgin Islands (now called the House of Assembly) in the 1999 general election, as the head of the newly formed National Democratic Party (NDP).  In 2003, Smith led the NDP to victory, defeating the ruling Virgin Islands Party for the first time since 1983 in the 2003 general election.

However, in the 2007 general election, Smith and his party suffered a defeat at the hands of the Virgin Islands Party, retaining only two seats (one of which was Smith's) out of 13 elected seats. Smith barely retained his seat as the at-large candidate, receiving the fourth largest number of votes. Smith remained in the legislature as the head of the opposition.

In the 2011 general election Smith and the National Democratic Party rebounded, and won an overall majority.  Accordingly, he was invited by the governor to form a new government.  He followed that with a second successive victory in the 2015 general election becoming only the second politician in the Territory to win three general elections as party leader.  He passed Willard Wheatley as the third longest serving head of Government in British Virgin Islands history on 14 February 2016.  However, he would need to win a fourth term to surpass Ralph O'Neal in second place.

During his political career, Smith has stood in each election as an "at large" candidate, and so is not affiliated with any individual political district.  In each election that he had stood in other than the 2007 election, he had garnered more votes than any other at large candidate (under the current political system in the British Virgin Islands, the four at large candidates with the highest number of votes are elected to the Legislative Council together with the representatives of each of the political districts; each voter casts up to five votes – one for the representative of their district, and up to four for the at large candidates).

In June 2018 Smith indicated he would be stepping down and not contesting the next general election.

Electoral history

References

1944 births
British Virgin Islands obstetricians
British Virgin Islands politicians
Leaders of the Opposition (British Virgin Islands)
Living people
Members of the House of Assembly of the British Virgin Islands
National Democratic Party (British Virgin Islands) politicians
Officers of the Order of the British Empire
People from Tortola
Premiers of the British Virgin Islands